Music for "The Knee Plays" (1985) is an album by David Byrne composed for Robert Wilson's opera the CIVIL warS. The album was released on vinyl; a remastered and expanded CD version was released in November 2007 under the title The Knee Plays and it includes eight previously unreleased bonus tracks and a DVD of the music set to a slideshow of 400 black and white photographs.

Track listing
All tracks written by David Byrne except where noted.

DVD track listing

Personnel
Garnett Brown - trombone
Ray Brown - trumpet on tracks 1–5, 10–12
David Byrne - vocals
Pete Christlieb - saxophone on tracks 1–5, 10–12
Rich Cooper - trumpet on tracks 1–5, 10–12
Ernie Fields Jr. - baritone saxophone
Chuck Findley - trumpet on tracks 1–4, 11
Bill Green - baritone saxophone
Bobbye Hall - percussion
Dana Hughes - trombone
Paul Humphrey - drums
Jackie Kelso - saxophone on tracks 5–10, 12
Harry Kim - trumpet on tracks 5–10, 12
Don Myrick - saxophone on tracks 1–4, 11
Nolan Smith - trumpet on tracks 1–5, 10–12
David Stout - trombone
Phil Teil - trombone
Ernie Watts - saxophone on tracks 1–4, 11
Fred Wesley - trombone

Release history

References

External links
Homepage for the re-release

Albums produced by David Byrne
David Byrne soundtracks
1985 soundtrack albums
Theatre soundtracks
ECM Records soundtracks
Regal Zonophone Records soundtracks
Nonesuch Records soundtracks